Dalibor Perković (born 1974) is a Croatian science fiction writer. He worked as a journalist and is now a physics teacher.

Biography
Born in Mali Lošinj, Perković now lives in Sesvete, Zagreb. Near the end of the 1990s he was a member of the Studentski list editorial staff and was a co-founder of another student newspaper, the SL Revolt. He started working for the at-the-time opposition daily Novi list in 1998. He left journalism and returned to college in 2002. He graduated with a degree in physics in 2005 and now works as a teacher.

Perković has written a collection of science fiction stories, as well as one novel. He received SFERA Awards for the best Croatian science fiction novellas in the previous year (Banijska praskozorja awarded in 2000 and Preko rijeke, awarded in 2004) and one for the best novel (Sva krv čovječanstva, awarded in 2006). He was a long-term editor of the SFeraKon Bulletin.

In 2012 he was a co-founder and the first president of "Nastavnici organizirano" ("Teachers Organised"), a non-government organisation whose aim is the development of the Croatian education system.

References

External links 
 https://web.archive.org/web/20090605194952/http://www.zarez.hr/159/kritika5.htm (in Croatian - a review in Zarez)
 http://daliborperkovic.com/ (author's blog in English)
 http://b3.blog.hr (author's blog in Croatian)
 https://sfera.hr/slike/2020/09/bibliografija.html (a list of author's published works)
 http://sfera.hr/perkovic/english.html (a list of author's works available in English)

Croatian science fiction writers
Living people
1974 births